Calanipeda is a monotypic genus of crustaceans belonging to the family Pseudodiaptomidae. The only species is Calanipeda aquaedulcis.

The species is found in Southwestern Europe.

References

Crustaceans